The Inter-Cities Fairs Cup, sometimes referred to as the European Fairs Cup, Fairs Cities' Cup, or simply as the Fairs Cup, was a European football competition played between 1955 and 1971. It is often considered the predecessor to the UEFA Cup (now the UEFA Europa League). The competition was the idea of FIFA vice-president and executive committee member Ernst Thommen, Italian Football Federation president and FIFA executive committee member Ottorino Barassi, and the English Football Association general secretary and president of FIFA from 1961 to 1974, Stanley Rous. As the name suggests, the competition was set up to promote international trade fairs. Friendly games were regularly held between teams from cities holding trade fairs and it was from these games that the competition evolved. The competition was initially only open to teams from cities that hosted trade fairs and where these teams finished in their national league had no relevance. Early competitions also featured a one city, one team rule. After 1964, it was sometimes referred to as the Runners-up Cup, with teams now qualifying based on league position. The winning team received the Noel Beard Trophy (Trophée Noel Beard), named for the cutler who designed it.

The competition was organised by the Fairs Cup Committee which was led by some FIFA executives until 1971, when it was abolished and replaced by the UEFA Cup.

While the Inter-Cities Fairs Cup is generally considered to be the predecessor to the UEFA Cup, it was not organised by UEFA. Consequently, the confederation does not consider clubs' records in the Fairs Cup to be part of their European record and regards its prestige as lesser than the UEFA Cup. There is no documentary evidence to support the claim that FIFA views the competition as a major honour, other than in articles submitted by clubs for inclusion in a series of club profiles, which was removed from the FIFA website in 2015.

History

Spanish era
The first competition was to be held over two seasons to avoid clashes with national leagues fixtures. Because it was also intended to coincide with trade fairs, it ran over into a third year. It commenced in 1955 and finished in 1958. Cities that entered teams included Barcelona, Basel, Birmingham, Copenhagen, Frankfurt, Vienna, Cologne, Lausanne, Leipzig, London, Milan, and Zagreb. The first competition included a group stage and also featured some city representative teams instead of clubs. The eventual finalists were the city of Barcelona, dubbed Barcelona XI, and a London XI. While the latter side consisted of players from 11 clubs, the former was effectively FC Barcelona with one player from RCD Espanyol. After a 2–2 draw at Stamford Bridge, Barcelona emerged triumphant after winning the return 6–0. A second tournament took place between 1958 and 1960. This time, the group stage format was abandoned in favour of a knockout tournament. Barcelona retained the cup, beating Birmingham City 4–1 in the final.

The third tournament was held over the course of the 1960–61 season and all subsequent tournaments were completed over one season. The season also saw the holders, Barcelona, compete in both the Fairs Cup and European Cup. During the early days of European competition, these tournaments were effectively rivals and there was little or no co-ordination between the administrators running them. The European Cup quickly established itself as the premier club competition, largely because it had the advantage of featuring national league champions and was completed in a single season from the very start. The efforts of Barcelona ended in failure in both competitions. In the Fairs Cup quarter-finals, they lost 7–6 on aggregate to Hibernian, while in the European Cup, they were beaten in the final by Benfica. Roma took three games to beat Hibernian in the semi-finals before they progressed to the final. Birmingham City reached their second final in two years but once again they were defeated. After a 2–2 draw at home, they lost 2–0 to Roma in the return.

The 1961–62 season saw the rules amended to allow three teams from each country to enter. The "one city, one team" rule was temporarily abandoned and two teams represented each of Edinburgh, Milan, and Barcelona (respectively Hibernian and Heart of Midlothian, Internazionale and A.C. Milan, and FC Barcelona and RCD Espanyol). This increase in teams resulted in Spanish teams continuing to dominate the competition. FC Barcelona were now regularly joined by Valencia CF and Real Zaragoza. These three clubs won the competition six times between them from 1958 to 1966. The Fairs Cup saw three all-Spanish finals in 1962, 1964, and 1966. The 1962 final saw Valencia CF beat FC Barcelona 7–3 on aggregate and in 1963 they retained the title after beating Dinamo Zagreb with a 4–1 aggregate score. They reached their third final in 1964 but lost 2–1 to Real Zaragoza in a single game at the Camp Nou.

The 1965 tournament saw a record entry of 48 teams, testimony to the growing status of the Fairs Cup. It also produced only the second final not to feature a Spanish team. Ferencvárosi TC of Hungary beat Juventus in another single-game final. The 1966 competition attracted attention for all the wrong reasons. Chelsea were pelted with rubbish at Roma and Leeds United fought a bruising encounter with Valencia CF which ended with three dismissals. Leeds also had Johnny Giles sent off in the semi-final against Real Zaragoza. The final saw FC Barcelona beat Real Zaragoza 4–3 on aggregate.

English era
The 1967 tournament saw the emergence of English clubs with Leeds United reaching the final. Although they lost to Dinamo Zagreb, they returned the following season and defeated Ferencvárosi TC to become the first English club to win the competition. The subsequent victories of Newcastle United and Arsenal and a second win for Leeds United saw English clubs winning the last four Fairs Cup tournaments. The last final saw Leeds United declared winners on away goals after drawing with Juventus 3–3 on aggregate.

UEFA Cup
In the 1971–72 season the competition was abolished and replaced by the UEFA Cup after UEFA revised the entry regulations and concluded that the "one city one team" rule related with the Fairs Cup must be abolished, which had had a particularly bad effect on English entrants for 1969–70, when Liverpool (2nd), Arsenal (4th), Southampton (7th), and Newcastle United (9th-also holders) got the places, at the expense of Everton (3rd), Chelsea (5th), Tottenham Hotspur (6th), and West Ham United (8th). The Football League upheld the geographic rule until 1975, when UEFA pressured the League to drop it or face sanctions. Everton that year, having come 4th, would have been excluded from the competition due to Liverpool's 2nd-place finish.

Finals

Trophy play-off match

After the 1970-71 tournament, the last of the Fairs Cup, the competition was abolished and replaced with the UEFA Cup.

The Fairs Cup trophy had not been won by any club permanently, so a play-off match was organised to decide who would gain permanent possession of the original competition trophy. Before the match, then FIFA President Sir Stanley Rous presented silver insignia to the members of the 1958 title-winning side, CF Barcelona.

The one-off match was played on 22 September 1971, between the first ever Fairs Cup winners, Barcelona, and the last winners, Leeds United. Barcelona won this play-off 2–1.

Performances

By club

All-time top scorers

Top scorers by season

Source: rsssf.com

See also
UEFA Cup

References

Bibliography

External links

Stats at RSSSF

 
Defunct international club association football competitions in Europe